Greenville Technical Charter High School (GTCHS) is a small school located on the Barton Campus of Greenville Technical College in Greenville, South Carolina, United States. It is a middle college high school. It was established as the first charter school in South Carolina and in partnership with Greenville Technical College. It was the first charter school to be awarded the National Blue Ribbon of Excellence (2010) and the Palmetto's Finest Award (2008).

College classes 
As part of the middle college program, students are encouraged to take college classes through Greenville Technical College for minimal fees; while the majority begin sophomore year, the Early College Cohort can begin as freshmen.  Approximately 60% of students graduate from GTCHS with 24 or more college credits and GTCHS graduates high school students with Associate Degrees every year.

Aviation and Science 
GTCHS was the first school in the state to pilot the AOPA Curriculum.  This innovative career pathway leads to three possible outcomes:  Pilot, Engineer, Aircraft Maintenance Technician. Whether students want to be certified in manned or unmanned flight, become an engineer or technician, or just learn more about science through the lens of aviation, this program promotes the skills they need for postsecondary careers in STEM.  In addition to the course offerings through Greenville Technical College, there are also unique science course offerings such as Metereology, Astronomy, and Marine Biology at GTCHS.

Arts 
The Fine Arts Program at GTCHS contains courses in drama, the visual arts, chorus, band, and orchestra.  In addition, students can take Musical Theater and be part of the International Thespian Society.  Warrior Arts has two productions annually:  a fall play and a spring musical.  In addition, they host additional events such as Improv Night, Winter and Spring concerts and Art Shows, and Murdery Mystery Dinner Theater.

Athletics 
The GTCHS Warriors are in Region I-AA in the state of South Carolina. There are seven sports with fifteen teams representing the school.

References

External links 
GTCHS website
Niche School Review

Educational institutions established in 1998
High schools in Greenville, South Carolina
Charter schools in South Carolina
Public high schools in South Carolina
1998 establishments in South Carolina